Lindsey Stirling: Live from London is the first video album by American violinist Lindsey Stirling. It was released on Europe on August 8, 2015 as a DVD video release. The release features performances filmed during the European leg of Stirling's second concert tour, the Shatter Me Tour. The album reached the top ten position in German album charts, being her third consecutive album in doing so. It also reached the peak position at the German music DVD charts.

Track listing

"Beyond the Veil"
"Mirror Haus"
"Electric Daisy Violin"
"Night Vision"
"Heist"
"Swag"
"We Are Giants" (featuring Dia Frampton)
"Transcendence"
"All of Me"
"Take Flight"
"Moon Trance"
"Roundtable Rival"
"Master of Tides"
"Crystallize"
"Shatter Me" (featuring Lzzy Hale)
"Stars Align"

References

2015 live albums
2015 video albums
Lindsey Stirling albums
Vertigo Records albums
Capitol Records albums
Universal Music Group albums
Classical crossover albums